The flag of the Estonian Soviet Socialist Republic was officially adopted by the former Soviet Union in 1940. It showed a set of Communist symbols: a yellow hammer and sickle on a red field and, after official change of the flag's design in 1953, also an outlined yellow star, above a band of water waves near the bottom.

History
After the Soviet invasion and occupation of Estonia in June 1940, the country was annexed to, and became an administrative subdivision of, the USSR under the name  "Estonian Soviet Socialist Republic". From 31 October 1940, a Soviet Union flag with Latin script ENSV replacing the star above the hammer and sickle, was officially used by the Soviet authorities. On 6 February 1953, a new version of the flag was adopted. It too followed the style of the flag of the Soviet Union, with six spiky blue and white wavy stripes added to the bottom.

During the period Estonian diaspora and diplomatic service around the world continued to use the national flag of Estonia, whereas the use of the national tricolour and its blue, black and white colour combination was banned and punishable by law in the Soviet Union.

On 20 October 1988 the usage of the blue-black-white flag was officially allowed again by Estonian authorities. On the evening of 23 February 1989 the Soviet flag was taken down permanently from the tower of Pikk Hermann of the Toompea Castle. It was replaced with the national blue-black-white flag on the next morning, 24 February, upon the 70th anniversary of the Estonian Declaration of Independence (1918).

With the Act on symbols of Estonia, passed on 8 May 1990, a year before Estonia regained full independence in 1991, the use of the Estonian SSR flag and emblem as state symbols was officially discontinued.

See also
 Flag of the Soviet Union
 Emblem of the Estonian SSR
 Flag of Magadan Oblast, similar design
 Flag of Estonia
 Flag of the Latvian Soviet Socialist Republic — a visually similar flag

Notes

Estonian Soviet Socialist Republic
Estonian Soviet Socialist Republic
Soviet Socialist Republic
Estonian Soviet Socialist Republic

de:Flagge Estlands#Geschichte